Ivan Filipović (born 13 November 1994) is a Croatian professional footballer who plays as a goalkeeper for Ligue 2 club Paris FC.

Club career
Filipović began his career with the youth academies of Graničar Županja and Cibalia, before beginning his senior career with Cibalia in 2012. He transferred to Lokomotiva Zagreb on 30 June 2015, where he was primarily the backup goalkeeper. He made his professional debut with Lokomotiva Zagreb in a 2–1 Croatian First Football League loss to Inter Zaprešić on 21 August 2015. For the 2017–18 season, he went on loan with Sesvete. On 19 June 2018, he transferred to Slaven Belupo where he was consistently their starting goalkeeper. On 30 June 2021, he transferred to the French club Paris FC in the Ligue 2.

References

External links
 
 HNS-CFF Profile

1994 births
Living people
Sportspeople from Slavonski Brod
Association football goalkeepers
Croatian footballers
HNK Cibalia players
NK Lokomotiva Zagreb players
NK Sesvete players
NK Slaven Belupo players
Paris FC players
Croatian Football League players
First Football League (Croatia) players
Ligue 2 players
Croatian expatriate footballers
Expatriate footballers in France
Croatian expatriate sportspeople in France